Harry Beasley (14 March 1892 – 26 November 1972) was a Canadian sprinter. He competed in the men's 100 metres at the 1912 Summer Olympics.

References

External links
 

1892 births
1972 deaths
Athletes (track and field) at the 1912 Summer Olympics
Canadian male sprinters
Olympic track and field athletes of Canada
People from the Columbia-Shuswap Regional District
Sportspeople from British Columbia